Alfred Redl (born 10 August 1940) is an Austrian judoka. He competed in the men's middleweight event at the 1964 Summer Olympics.

References

1940 births
Living people
Austrian male judoka
Olympic judoka of Austria
Judoka at the 1964 Summer Olympics
Place of birth missing (living people)
20th-century Austrian people